Shoji Shiba (司馬 正次) is an international expert in Total Quality Management (TQM) and Breakthrough Management. Globally he is best known for developing the "Five Step Discovery Process" for Breakthrough Management. In the recent years he has been guiding the transformation of the Indian manufacturing industry.

A Deming Prize winner in an individual capacity for propagating TQM amongst corporates and governments, Prof. Shiba has authored books like 'A New American TQM' (co-authored by David Walden and Alan Graham), 'Integrated Management Systems' (co-authored by Thomas H Lee and Robert Chapman Wood), 'Four Practical Revolutions in Management' (with David Walden) in English and 'Breakthrough Management' (Japanese  2003; English 2006).

Prof. Shiba is Professor Emeritus of University of Tsukuba in Japan, Advisory Professor, Shanghai Jiao Tong University, China, and Distinguished Honorary Professor, Indian Institute of Technology, Kanpur. From 1990 to 2004, he taught at the Sloan School of Management, MIT.

He is, at present, the Chief Advisor to the Visionary Leaders for Manufacturing Programme (VLFM) in India. It is an innovative management transformation programme being implemented in collaboration with Japan International Cooperation Agency, to create a critical mass of Visionary Leaders to lead India’s manufacturing sector into future growth. It is a globally successful experiment in collaboration with the Indian Industry (Confederation of Indian Industry),Indian Academia (Indian Institute of Management Calcutta, Indian Institute of Technology, Kanpur and Madras) and the Indian Government (National Manufacturing Competitiveness Council).

Prof Shiba has also diffused TQM concepts to industry and governments of various countries, including Chile, China, France, Hungary, Ireland, Italy, Malaysia, Norway, Portugal, Spain, Sweden, Switzerland, Thailand, United States, the United Kingdom, and the former USSR.

Awards
 March, 2018: Interviewed by Anurit Kanti, a renowned journalist.
 Jan. 2012: Padma Shri Award from the Government of India
 Jul. 2011: Award from the Emperor of Japan -  The Order of the Sacred Treasure, Gold Rays with Neck Ribbon for " immense contributions towards fostering academic exchanges between Japan and India"
 Nov. 2006: Grand Cross Order of Merit of the Republic of Hungary
 2004: The Nikkei Quality Management Literature Award for the publication of his book on Breakthrough management
 2002: Deming Prize for individuals for "outstanding contribution to quality management methods and for dedication to developing the globalization of TQM"
 2001: “Excellence in Teaching” award at MIT, Pune.

References

Further reading

External links

 National Manufacturing Competitiveness Council (NMCC), Government of India 
 Quality Process Improvement - Tools & Techniques (Shoji Shiba and David Walden, 30 July 2002)
 Book: Integrated Management Systems: A Practical Approach to Transforming Organizations (Operations Management Series) 

1930 births
Living people
Japanese business theorists
University of Tsukuba alumni
University of Tokyo alumni
Recipients of the Padma Shri in trade and industry
Grand Crosses of the Order of Merit of the Republic of Hungary (civil)